The yellow-bellied house snake (Lamprophis fuscus) is a species of snake in the family Colubridae . It is endemic to South Africa.

References

Lamprophis
Reptiles of South Africa
Reptiles described in 1893
Taxonomy articles created by Polbot